New Byth is a small inland planned village in the Banff and Buchan committee area of Aberdeenshire, Scotland, that lies a few miles northeast of Cuminestown. It was founded in 1763 by the then Laird of Byth, James Urquhart.

The village has few facilities, the former primary school having closed in 2005, followed by the Post Office in 2006, and the village pub in 2008. There are two former church buildings, the larger previously affiliated to the Church of Scotland (1857, A & W Reid) and now derelict, the smaller associated with the United Free Church of Scotland until 1929 and now owned by a community association which hires it out as a general-purpose hall. The village had an active branch of the Scottish Women's Rural Institute for 50 years to 2011, when it merged with the Monquhitter branch.

The village hosts an annual steam and vintage rally, usually on the Sunday closest to 1 July.

References
Specific

General
New Byth in the Gazetteer for Scotland.

Bibliography

Villages in Aberdeenshire
1763 establishments in Scotland